On These Shoulders (Swedish: På dessa skuldror) is a 1948 Swedish drama film directed by Gösta Folke and starring Ulf Palme, Anita Björk and Holger Löwenadler. It was made at the Centrumateljéerna  Studios in Stockholm and on location around Jämshög. The film's sets were designed by the art director Bibi Lindström. It was based on a 1942 novel of the same title by Sven Edvin Salje.

Cast
 Ulf Palme as Kjell Loväng
 Anita Björk as Birgit Larsson
 Holger Löwenadler as Arvid Loväng
 Märta Arbin as Inga Loväng
 Keve Hjelm as Simon Loväng
 Agneta Prytz as Edla, maid
 Ingrid Borthen as	Elin Tarp
 Carl Ström as Elis
 Ragnvi Lindbladh as Sonja Eriksson
 Oscar Ljung as 	Andreasson
 Carl Deurell as Botvid
 Erik Hell as Aron Loväng
 Börje Mellvig as Börje Loväng
 John Norrman as Mr. Tarp
 Artur Cederborgh as Måns-Erik Eriksson
 Ivar Kåge as Osbar
 Olav Riégo as Magnusson
 Georg Skarstedt as Blind-Ove
 Magnus Kesster as Old Gypsy
 Lars Kåge as Gösta Osbar
 Sif Ruud as Mrs. Andreasson
 Astrid Bodin as Gunda Fredriksson
 Hanny Schedin as Sonja's mother

References

Bibliography 
 Qvist, Per Olov & von Bagh, Peter. Guide to the Cinema of Sweden and Finland. Greenwood Publishing Group, 2000.
 Sundholm, John . Historical Dictionary of Scandinavian Cinema. Scarecrow Press, 2012.

External links 
 

1948 films
Swedish drama films
1948 drama films
1940s Swedish-language films
Films directed by Gösta Folke
Films based on Swedish novels
1940s Swedish films